A baked apple is a dish consisting of an apple baked in an oven until it has become soft. The core is usually removed and the resulting cavity stuffed with sweet or savory fillings and seasonings. Pears and quinces may be prepared in the same way.

Baked apples are found in many European cuisines, including colonial ones. In Germany, baked apples are often served during the Christmas season.

Preparation

The apples are cored, often not through the bottom, and sometimes peeled halfway down to prevent bursting.

The cavity is filled with seasonings and sometimes other fillings.

Seasonings may include sweeteners such as brown sugar, honey, maple syrup, or fruit preserves; spices such as cinnamon, nutmeg, cloves, aniseed, and mace; butter; and liquids such as brandy, calvados, or wine.

Fillings may be fresh or dried fruits such as raisins, dates, prunes, oatmeal, as well as nuts such as pistachios or walnuts, which are typical in Bulgaria; the Bosnian dish tufahije is also stuffed with walnuts, but is poached rather than baked; marzipan is sometimes used in Germany. Many recipes include lemon juice for tartness.

The apples are then baked until soft.

Variations

Baked apples can also be a savory dish, used as a side dish for roasts, or standing on their own, stuffed with sausage or mincemeat.

A black cap is a kind of baked apple cut in two crosswise, cored, filled with lemon rind and candied orange peel or orange marmalade, reassembled, and baked with wine and sugar. The oven is started very hot to blacken the tops.

Baked apples may be baked until dry to make them suitable for storage. In the cuisine of Norfolk, England, a biffin or beefing is an apple which is baked between a weight, to flatten it into a cake, and a layer of straw, to absorb moisture, and usually made from the Norfolk Biffin cultivar. It is typically served with cream after the skin is removed.

A baked apple wrapped in a pastry crust is an apple dumpling.

Serving

Baked apples may be served with custard sauce, crème fraîche, sour cream, ice cream, heavy cream, and so on.

See also
 Apple sauce, sometimes made by baking
 Apple chips, dried apple slices
 Apple dumplings, a similar dish where the apples are wrapped in pastry

 List of apple dishes

Notes

European cuisine
Desserts
Apple dishes